Arnulfo González Navarro (born 9 August 1991 in San Buenaventura, Coahuila) is a Mexican professional footballer who plays for Loros de la Universidad de Colima. He also played for Santos Laguna.

References

External links
 
 

1991 births
Living people
Association football midfielders
Santos Laguna footballers
Alebrijes de Oaxaca players
Liga MX players
Ascenso MX players
Footballers from Coahuila
Mexican footballers
People from San Buenaventura, Coahuila